Donald Kozak (born February 2, 1952) is a Canadian former professional ice hockey forward. During his career he played for the Los Angeles Kings and Vancouver Canucks of the National Hockey League (NHL), as well as several teams in the minor leagues. Kozak played junior for the Saskatoon Blades, Swift Current Broncos, and Edmonton Oil Kings before being selected by the Kings in the 1972 NHL Amateur Draft. He made his professional debut that year with Los Angeles, playing with the Kings until 1978. He would spend part of a season with the Canucks before finishing his career in the minor leagues, ending with a season in Germany before retiring in 1982. Kozak played a total of 437 games in the NHL.

Playing career
On April 17, 1977, Kozak scored a record-breaking six-second goal against the Boston Bruins in the Stanley Cup quarterfinals, setting the Stanley Cup playoffs for fastest goal.

Career statistics

Regular season and playoffs

Awards
 WCHL Second All-Star Team – 1972

External links 

1952 births
Living people
Binghamton Whalers players
Canadian expatriate ice hockey players in the United States
Canadian ice hockey right wingers
Cincinnati Stingers (CHL) players
Dallas Black Hawks players
Edmonton Oil Kings (WCHL) players
Ice hockey people from Saskatchewan
Los Angeles Kings draft picks
Los Angeles Kings players
Saskatoon Blades players
Sportspeople from Saskatoon
Springfield Indians players
Tulsa Oilers (1964–1984) players
Vancouver Canucks players